Palomar 2 is a globular cluster part of the Palomar group located in the constellation of Auriga. Palomar 2 is part of a group of 15 globulars known as the Palomar Globular Clusters, discovered in survey plates from the first National Geographic Society – Palomar Observatory Sky Survey in the 1950s.

References

External links
 

Globular clusters
Auriga (constellation)
•